Criss Cross is a novel by Lynne Rae Perkins that won the 2006 Newbery Medal for excellence in children's literature.  It includes the character Debbie from her previous novel, All Alone in the Universe, but introduces several new characters, primarily her neighborhood friends Hector, Lenny and Phil.

Plot
This story takes place in Seldem, during spring and summer. It follows the criss-crossing stories of a group of middle-school children. A necklace plays a significant part in all of the criss-cross moments, helping the characters in the book to find their true selves, giving the novel a touch of magic realism. 

Debbie usually spends time with her four friends, Patty, Hector, Lenny, and Phil. A typical summer for them would be to hang around town and sit in Lenny's dad's pickup truck, listening to the radio.  During this summer vacation, however, Debbie moved into the front of their family parlor, and she has her own room. She then gets a job helping an elderly woman. She meets her boss' grandson, Peter, and they share a quick, romantic week together. Soon after he leaves back to his town in California. All of the friends go through their own changes throughout the summer and each grow in their own way. In the end, to tie up their summer, they all have a block party, and are now more mature, and use their new knowledge to move along in life.

Reception
Kirkus Reviews described Criss Cross as "A tenderly existential work that will reward more thoughtful readers in this age of the ubiquitous action saga." According to The Horn Book Magazine, "In idiosyncratic, wistful prose, Perkins mines every moment of missed connection and near-change with a hypnotic hyperawareness reminiscent of adolescence itself." In 2008, Anita Silvey, author of 100 Best Books for Children, described Criss Cross in a School Library Journal article as one of several recent Newbery winners considered "particularly disappointing" by public librarians.

References

2005 American novels
2005 children's books
American children's novels
Newbery Medal–winning works
Novels set in Pittsburgh
Novels set in the 1970s
Novels about friendship
Greenwillow Books books